= 1922–23 Plunket Shield season =

Cricket tournament in New Zealand

1922–23 Plunket Shield
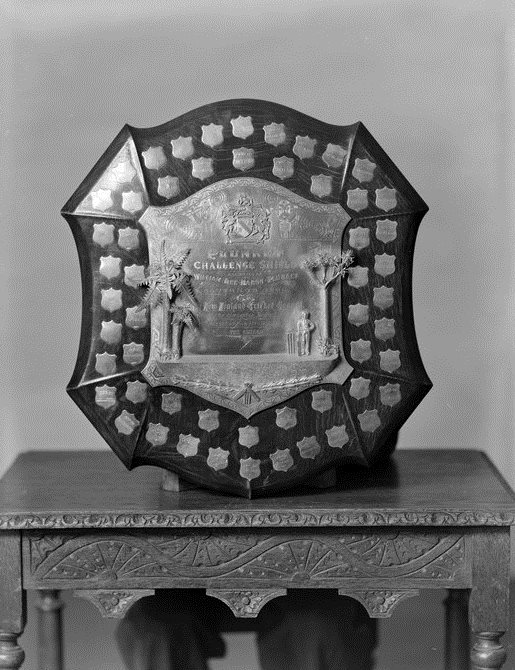
- The Plunket Shield trophy
- Cricket format: First-class
- Tournament format(s): Round-robin
- Champions: Canterbury (1st title)
- Participants: 4
- Matches: 6

The 1922–23 Plunket Shield season was a tournament of the Plunket Shield, the domestic first-class cricket competition of New Zealand.

Canterbury won the championship, finishing at the top of the points table at the end of the round-robin tournament between four first-class sides, Auckland, Canterbury, Otago and Wellington.

== Table ==
Below are the Plunket Shield standings for the 1922–23 season:

Team	Played	Won	Drawn	Lost	NetRpW
Canterbury	3	3	0	0	8.020
Wellington	3	1	1	1	0.845
Auckland	3	1	2	0	-1.600
Otago	3	0	2	1	-8.474
